William Henry Landis (born October 8, 1942) is an American former professional baseball pitcher. A left-hander, he appeared in 102 games pitched in Major League Baseball (MLB) in 1963 and from –1969 for the Kansas City Athletics and Boston Red Sox.

Landis signed with the Athletics in 1961 and appeared in one game for them two years later, a late-season relief assignment against the Cleveland Indians. In the minor leagues, he was known for his wildness, issuing over 100 bases on balls during three of his first four seasons as a professional. The Red Sox selected him in the 1966 Rule 5 Draft and he pitched for them for the next three full MLB seasons. During his rookie campaign, the 1967 "Impossible Dream" Red Sox unexpectedly won the American League pennant. Still struggling with his control, Landis worked in only 18 games that year and missed the 1967 World Series due to U.S. Army Reserve commitments.

In , Landis enjoyed his finest season in the majors. Working in 38 games, 37 in relief, he compiled a strong 3.15 earned run average and a career-high three saves. He also struck out twice as many hitters (59) as he walked (30). In 1969, Landis was used more frequently, setting career bests in appearances (45) and innings pitched (82), but he was plagued by a sore arm and his effectiveness diminished. Boston shipped him to Triple-A Louisville in 1970, and Landis left baseball after a brief Triple-A trial in 1971 with the St. Louis Cardinals.

For his MLB career, Landis posted a 9–8 record with a 4.46 ERA in 102 appearances. In six starts, he failed to register a complete game. He was credited with four saves. In 169 innings pitched, he allowed 154 hits and 91 bases on balls, with 135 strikeouts.

References

External links

1942 births
Living people
Baseball players from California
Binghamton Triplets players
Boston Red Sox players
Birmingham Barons players
Dallas Rangers players
Kansas City Athletics players
Lewiston Broncs players
Louisville Colonels (minor league) players
Major League Baseball pitchers
People from Hanford, California
Tulsa Oilers (baseball) players
Vancouver Mounties players
Visalia A's players